Narmada district is an administrative district in the state of Gujarat in India. The district headquarters are located at Rajpipla. The district is bounded by Vadodara and Chhota Udaipur districts in the north, by Nandurbar district of Maharashtra state in the east, by Surat and Tapi districts in the south and by Bharuch district in the west. The district occupies an area of 2,755 km² and has a population of 590,297 (as of 2011). It was 10.44% urban as of 2011. As of 2011, it is the third least populous district of Gujarat (out of 33), after Dang and Porbandar.

History
This district was carved out on October 2, 1997. The newly formed district consisted of Tilakwada taluka of erstwhile Vadodara district and 3 talukas of erstwhile Bharuch district: Nandod, Dediyapada and Sagbara.

Administration 
The district consists of 5 talukas: Tilakwada, Garudeshwar, Nandod (including Rajpipla), Dediyapada, and Sagbara. It consists two Vidhan Sabha constituency: Nandod and Dediapada

Economy
In 2006 the Ministry of Panchayati Raj named Narmada one of the country's 250 most backward districts (out of a total of 640). It is one of the six districts in Gujarat currently receiving funds from the Backward Regions Grant Fund Programme (BRGF).

Demographics

According to the 2011 census Narmada district has a population of 590,297, roughly equal to the nation of Solomon Islands or the US state of Wyoming. This gives it a ranking of 528th in India (out of a total of 640). Its population growth rate over the decade 2001-2011 was 14.77%. Narmada has a sex ratio of 960 females for every 1000 males, and a literacy rate of 73.29%. 10.48% of the population lives in urban areas. Scheduled Castes and Scheduled Tribes make up 1.48% and 81.55% of the population respectively.

At the time of the 2011 Census of India, 68.50% of the population in the district spoke Gujarati, 26.37% Vasavi, 1.73% Hindi and 0.93% Bhili as their first language.

Places of interest 

 Ninai Falls
 Sardar Sarovar Dam
 Statue of Unity (Sardar Patel Statue)

Politics
  

|}

See also
 Shoolpaneshwar Wildlife Sanctuary
 Statue of Unity
 Narmada River
 Nandurbar district

References

Notes

External links 

 Official website

 
Districts of Gujarat
1997 establishments in Gujarat